Deroceras vascoana is a species of air-breathing land slug in the family Agriolimacidae. It is native to France and Spain.

This slug is pale brown in color. Collected specimens are 2.2 to 3.2 centimeters long. D. vascoana "is easily recognizable anatomically by the shape and colouration of its penis", a main diagnostic character. The "relatively small" and "bulbous" penis is purple-brown in color at the apex, and the branching penial appendage is white. When disturbed, the slug produces a copious white mucus.

References

Agriolimacidae
Molluscs of Europe
Fauna of Spain
Gastropods described in 1986
Taxonomy articles created by Polbot
Taxobox binomials not recognized by IUCN